KZUL-FM (104.5 FM, "Kazual FM") is a radio station licensed to serve Lake Havasu City, Arizona, United States. The station is owned by Murphy Broadcasting and licensed to Mad Dog Wireless, Inc. It airs an Adult Contemporary music format.

The station was assigned the KZUL-FM call letters by the Federal Communications Commission on May 23, 1986.

Translators

References

External links
 KZUL-FM official website
 Murphy Broadcasting
 

ZUL-FM
Mainstream adult contemporary radio stations in the United States
Mass media in Mohave County, Arizona
Lake Havasu City, Arizona
Radio stations established in 1984